Brand Breakout: How Emerging Market Brands Will Go Global is a book by Nirmalya Kumar and Jan-Benedict Steenkamp.  This book looks at what emerging market brands need to do to succeed in global markets. It has been rated as one of the best business books of 2013.

See also
Diaspora Marketing

References

External links
Brand Breakout
Local brands pursuing global recognition
Best Business Books 2013: Globalization
China's Future in Brand Awareness

2013 non-fiction books
Business books
Marketing books
Palgrave Macmillan books